The Montagne-du-Diable Regional Park (in French: Parc régional Montagne du Diable) is a regional park located in the municipality of Ferme-Neuve, in the Antoine-Labelle Regional County Municipality, in administrative region of Laurentides, in Quebec, in Canada.

History 
The Mount Sir-Wilfrid was named in 1932 in honor of Sir Wilfrid Laurier (1841-1919) who was the Prime Minister of Canada from 1896 to 1911. The proximity of the mountain to the municipality of Mont-Laurier would have a link in the choice of the toponym of the mountain.

Main features and activities 
This park is open year-round. In summer, visitors can go hiking, mountain biking, canoeing/kayaking, paddle boarding, hebertism circuit, outdoor day camp. The winter activities are: snowshoeing, classic skiing, Nordic skiing, skating no skating, ski hok, fatbike, acadéski.

The Village des Bâtisseurs has several infrastructures for recreational tourism activities:
 Eight nature chalets, six of which have a capacity of 6 to 10 people, and two chalets on stilts with a capacity of 4 to 6 people;
 Five unserviced campsites on the shores of "Lac de la Montagne";

The Mount Sir-Wilfrid is covered by three storeys of tree types: the maple-yellow birch grove at the bottom of the mountain; a mixture of white birch and softwood as it approaches 500 meters above sea level; the boreal forest, on top of the mountain.

Notes and references

External links 
 Official website of Parc régional de la Montagne du Diable (Montagne-du-Diable Regional Park)

Protected areas of Laurentides
Antoine-Labelle Regional County Municipality
Regional Parks of Quebec
Nature reserves in Quebec